Lawriston was a 22-gun corvette of the French Navy.

Career 
Originally a ship of the French East India Company, Lawriston was  brought into service in the French Navy. She took part in the Siege of Pondicherry in 1778.

She was returned to merchant service in June 1781 at Île de France but again requisitioned in December 1781.

HMS Isis captured her on 16 February 1782, during the prelude of the Battle of Sadras. Lawriston was carrying a large part of the field artillery for the French army in the Indian Ocean, as well as two companies of the Légion de Lauzun. Her captain had decided to pray on small merchantmen, and failed to escape in time when the British appeared.

Notes, citations, and references
Notes

Citations

References
 
 

Corvettes of the French Navy
1778 ships